This is a list of British television related events from 1977.

Events

January
1 January – BBC1 airs its network television premiere of the 1971 musical film Willy Wonka and the Chocolate Factory, starring Gene Wilder.
3 January – The US crime drama series, Charlie's Angels makes its UK debut on ITV,  starring  Kate Jackson, Farrah Fawcett and Jaclyn Smith as the crime-fighting trio, the "Angels".
10 January – ITV broadcasts the first episode of the children's supernatural drama Children of the Stones.

February
3 February – The Annan Committee on the future of broadcasting makes its recommendations. They include the establishment of a fourth independent television channel, the establishment of Broadcasting Complaints Commission and an increase in independent production.
14 February – BBC1 debut the children's animated series The Flumps, which, although only 13 episodes are ever produced, will be broadcast on the BBC until 1988.
15 February – The first Aardman Animations character, Morph, is introduced with the launch of BBC children's series Take Hart with Tony Hart.
24 February – ITV begins showing the US medical mystery drama series Quincy, M.E., starring Jack Klugman. 
26 February – The network television premiere of the 1965 James Bond film Thunderball airs on ITV, starring Sean Connery in his fourth 007 adventure.
February – Michael Grade is appointed as Director of Programmes at London Weekend Television.

March
27 March – Jesus of Nazareth, a British-Italian television miniseries co-produced by Lew Grade dramatising the birth, life, ministry, death and resurrection of Jesus based on the accounts in the four New Testament Gospels makes its debut on British television, starring Robert Powell as Jesus.
28 March – Yorkshire Television and Tyne Tees Television launch a nine-week breakfast television experiment. It is credited as being the United Kingdom's first breakfast television programme, six years before the launch of TV-am and the BBC's Breakfast Time in 1983. Both programmes run at the same time, with Tyne Tees' Good Morning North and Yorkshire's Good Morning Calendar. Both programmes finish on Friday 27 May.

April
22 April – The original series of motoring programme Top Gear begins as a local magazine format produced by (and shown only by) BBC Midlands from its Pebble Mill Studios in Birmingham, presented by Angela Rippon and Tom Coyne. In 1978, it is offered to BBC2 where it airs until 2001. In 2002, the series is relaunched in a new format.

May
7 May – The 22nd Eurovision Song Contest is held in London. With Angela Rippon as the presenter, the contest is won by Marie Myriam representing France, with the song "L'oiseau et l'enfant" (The Bird and the Child). The British entry, "Rock Bottom", written and sung by Lynsey de Paul and Mike Moran finishes in second place.

June
6–9 June – Television viewers in Britain and around the world watch live coverage of the celebrations of the Silver Jubilee of Elizabeth II, while the soap opera Coronation Street features an elaborate Jubilee parade in the storyline, having Rovers' Return Inn manageress Annie Walker dress up in elaborate costume as Queen Elizabeth I. Ken Barlow and Uncle Albert play Edmund Hillary and Sherpa Tenzing respectively.
20 June – Anglia Television broadcasts the fake documentary Alternative 3. It enters into the conspiracy theory canon.

July
2 July – BBC2 launch a new season of Saturday evening horror movie double bills with Dracula, Frankenstein - and Friends!
7 July – The first episode of the BBC documentary series Brass Tacks is aired, featuring a debate as to whether Myra Hindley should be considered for parole from the life sentence she received for her role in the Moors murders in 1966.

August
No events.

September
7 September – The long-running game show The Krypton Factor makes its debut on ITV, presented by Gordon Burns.
12 September – Thames Television launches Thames at Six, a regional news programme that replaces the more light-hearted magazine programme Today.
18 September – The occasional ITV bloopers programme It'll Be Alright on the Night is first broadcast, presented by Denis Norden.
19 September – BBC Schools and Colleges changes to use the Dots ident with rotating text until 1978.

October
1 October – Ian Trethowan succeeds Charles Curran as Director-General of the BBC.
17 October – BBC1 launch the long-running variety and chat show Des O'Connor Tonight.
19 October – The first edition of a new weekly magazine programme for Asian women, Gharbar, is broadcast. The programme had only been intended to run for 26 weeks but continues for around 500 weeks, finally ending in April 1987.
21 October – The World Administrative Radio Conference assigns five high-powered direct broadcast by satellite channels for domestic use in the UK.

November
13 November – BBC1 airs the final episode of Dad's Army, first broadcast in 1968.
19 November – Southern Television broadcasts the US children's series Sesame Street for the first time.
20 November – The network television premiere of the 1967 James Bond film You Only Live Twice on ITV, starring Sean Connery.
26 November – Southern Television broadcast interruption: Just after 5:10pm in the Southern Television ITV region, a hoaxer hijacks the sound of Independent Television News from the IBA transmitter at Hannington, Hampshire and broadcasts a message claiming to be a representative of the Ashtar Galactic Command. Thousands of viewers ring Southern, the IBA, ITN or the police for an explanation; the identity of the intruder is never confirmed.

December
22 December – BBC2 shows an adaptation of Bram Stoker's vampire novel Count Dracula, starring Louis Jordan.
24 December – BBC1 screen the network television premiere of Robert Altman's 1970 Korean War-set comedy film M*A*S*H, starring Donald Sutherland and Elliott Gould.
25 December – Both the Mike Yarwood Christmas Show and The Morecambe & Wise Christmas Show on BBC1 attract an audience of more than 28 million, one of the highest ever in British television history.
30 December – ITV launch the crime-action series The Professionals starring Lewis Collins and Martin Shaw as CI5 agents Bodie and Doyle. 
31 December – Bruce Forsyth steps down as presenter of The Generation Game after six years. He would return to the programme when it is revived by the BBC in 1990.

Undated
Scum, an entry in BBC1's Play for Today anthology strand, is pulled from transmission due to controversy over its depiction of life in a Young Offenders' Institution, at this time known in the United Kingdom as a borstal. Two years later the director Alan Clarke makes a film version with most of the same cast and the original play itself is eventually transmitted on Channel 4 in 1991.
Emmerdale Farm moves from daytime to a peak time (7pm) slot although five regions, Anglia Television, Thames Television, Westward Television/TSW, Grampian Television and Scottish Television aired the programme at 5:15pm, with the days sometime changing.

Debuts

BBC1
2 January – Wings (1977–1978)
5 January – Rosie (1977–1981)
7 January – Mr. Big (1977)
9 January – Rascal the Raccoon (1977)
1 February – Fathers and Families (1977)
13 February – Rob Roy (1977)
14 February – The Flumps (1977–1978)
15 February – Take Hart (1977–1983)
16 March – Out of Bounds (1977)
27 March 
Nicholas Nickleby (1977)
Jubilee (1977)
5 April – A Roof Over My Head (1977)
8 April – Roots (1977)
12 April – Citizen Smith (1977–1980)
25 April – Fred Basset (1977)
2 May – The Mackinnons (1977)
10 June – No Appointment Necessary (1977)
11 June – Supernatural (1977)
15 June 
 The House That Jack Built (1977)
Middlemen (1977) 
4 September – The Eagle of the Ninth (1977)
7 September – Secret Army (1977–1979)
9 September – Target (1977–1978)
10 September – The Peppermint Pig (1977)
17 October – Des O'Connor Tonight (1977–2002)
1 November 
Abigail's Party (Play for Today) (1977)
The Other One (1977–1978)
2 November – King Cinder (1977)
9 November — The Emigrants (miniseries) (1977)
13 November – The Children of  the New Forest (1977)
13 December – Come Back Mrs. Noah (1977–1978)
31 December – The New Adventures of Batman (1977)

BBC2
10 January – Eleanor Marx (1977)
11 January – Look and Read: The King's Dragon (1977)
26 January – The Velvet Glove (1977)
7 February – Headmaster (1977)
20 February – Drama (1977)
 8 March – Three Piece Suite (1977)
10 April – Esther Waters (1977)
18 April – Don't Forget to Write! (1977–1979)
22 April – Top Gear (1977–2001)
8 May – Murder Most English (1977)
12 May – Sea Tales (1977) (Anthology)
13 June – Maidens' Trip (1977)
2 July – Dracula, Frankenstein - and Friends! (1977)
6 July – Brass Tacks (1977–1988)
16 August – Marie Curie (1977)
18 September – 1990 (1977–1978)
19 September – The Long Search (1977)
21 September – BBC2 Play of the Week (1977–1979)
22 September – Premiere (1977–1980)
25 September – Anna Karenina (1977)
19 October – Parosi (1977–1978)
21 October – Kilvert's Diary (1977)
7 November – Who Pays the Ferryman? (1977)
30 November – Eustace and Hilda (1977)
22 December – Count Dracula (1977)

ITV
3 January – Charlie's Angels (1976–1981)
5 January – Another Bouquet (1977)
10 January – Children of the Stones (1977)
11 January – Robin's Nest (1977–1981)
16 January – Holding On (1977)
6 February – Just William  (1977–1978)
9 February – Horse in the House (1977)
12 February – All You Need Is Love (1977)
17 February – The Galton & Simpson Playhouse (1977)
24 February – Quincy, M.E. (1976–1983)
25 February – Raffles (1977)
2 March – Romance (1977)
27 March – Jesus of Nazareth (1977)
15 April – Backs to the Land (1977–1978)
18 April 
Miss Jones and Son (1977–1978)
The Flockton Flyer (1977–1978)
20 April – Dawson and Friends (1977)
21 April – Paradise Island (1977)
7 May – Dynomutt, Dog Wonder (1976–1977)
8 May – King of the Castle (1977)
18 May – A Bunch of Fives (1977–1978)
29 May – The Sunday Drama (1977–1978)
31 May – Burgess, Philby and Maclean (1977)
6 June – Two Stars for Comfort (1977)
13 June – Cottage to Let (1977)
20 June – Alternative 3 (1977)
26 June – Follow Me (1977)
6 July – I'm Bob, He's Dickie (1977–1978)
8 July – The Foundation (1977–1978)
15 July – Devenish (1977)
17 July – Hi Summer (1977)
28 July – A Sharp Intake of Breath (1977–1981)
28 July – The Sound of Laughter (1977)
31 July – Here I Stand... (1977)
1 August – Lord Tramp (1977)
7 August – Took and Co. (1977)
24 August – The Paper Lads (1977–1979)
1 September – The Mighty B! (1977–1982)
6 September 
London Belongs to Me (1977)
You're Only Young Twice (1977–1981)
7 September – The Krypton Factor (1977–1995, 2009–2010)
8 September – The Fuzz (1977)
9 September – Love for Lydia (1977)
18 September – It'll Be Alright on the Night (1977–present)
19 September – Raven (1977) 
24 September – The Love Boat (1977–1986)
25 September – The Cost of Loving (1977)
26 September – The Upchat Line (1977)
5 October – The Norman Conquests (1977)
12 October – Midnight Is a Place (1977–1978)
18 October – The Sullivans (1976–1983)
25 October – Hard Times (1977)
27 October – Odd Man Out (1977)
9 November – Dummy (1977)
30 December 
Mind Your Language (1977–1979)
The Professionals (1977–1983)

Returning after a break of a year or longer
The Rag Trade (1961–1963; 1977–1978)

Continuing television shows

1920s
BBC Wimbledon (1927–1939, 1946–2019, 2021–present)

1930s
The Boat Race (1938–1939, 1946–2019)
BBC Cricket (1939, 1946–1999, 2020–2024)

1940s
Come Dancing (1949–1998)

1950s
The Good Old Days (1953–1983)
Panorama (1953–present)
Crackerjack (1955–1984, 2020–present)
Opportunity Knocks (1956–1978, 1987–1990)
This Week (1956–1978, 1986–1992)
What the Papers Say (1956–2008)
The Sky at Night (1957–present)
Blue Peter (1958–present)
Grandstand (1958–2007)

1960s
Coronation Street (1960–present)
Songs of Praise (1961–present)
Z-Cars (1962–1978)
Animal Magic (1962–1983)
Doctor Who (1963–1989, 2005–present)
World in Action (1963–1998)
Top of the Pops (1964–2006)
Match of the Day (1964–present)
Crossroads (1964–1988, 2001–2003)
Play School (1964–1988)
Mr. and Mrs. (1965–1999)
World of Sport (1965–1985)
Jackanory (1965–1996, 2006)
Sportsnight (1965–1997)
It's a Knockout (1966–1982, 1999–2001)
The Money Programme (1966–2010)
ITV Playhouse (1967–1982)
Magpie (1968–1980)
The Big Match (1968–2002)
Nationwide (1969–1983)
Screen Test (1969–1984)

1970s
The Goodies (1970–1982)
The Onedin Line (1971–1980)
The Old Grey Whistle Test (1971–1987)
The Two Ronnies (1971–1987, 1991, 1996, 2005)
Clapperboard (1972–1982)
Crown Court (1972–1984)
Pebble Mill at One (1972–1986)
Rainbow (1972–1992, 1994–1997)
Are You Being Served? (1972–1985)
Emmerdale (1972–present)
Newsround (1972–present)
Weekend World (1972–1988)
Pipkins (1973–1981)
We Are the Champions (1973–1987)
Last of the Summer Wine (1973–2010)
That's Life! (1973–1994)
Happy Ever After (1974–1978)
Rising Damp (1974–1978)
Within These Walls (1974–1978)
It Ain't Half Hot Mum (1974–1981)
Tiswas (1974–1982)
Wish You Were Here...? (1974–2003)
The Good Life (1975–1978)
The Sweeney (1975–1978)
Celebrity Squares (1975–1979, 1993–1997, 2014–2015)
The Cuckoo Waltz (1975–1980)
Arena (1975–present)
Jim'll Fix It (1975–1994)
The Muppet Show (1976–1981)
When the Boat Comes In (1976–1981)
Multi-Coloured Swap Shop (1976–1982)
Rentaghost (1976–1984)
One Man and His Dog (1976–present)

Ending this year
 23 February – The Wheeltappers and Shunters Social Club (1974–1977)
 25 March – Porridge (1974–1977)
 8 June – Survivors (1975–1977)
 24 August – The Adventures of Rupert Bear (1969–1977)
 13 November – Dad's Army (1968–1977)
 17 December – The New Avengers (1976–1977)
 24 December – The Duchess of Duke Street (1976–1977)
 31 December – Rascal the Raccoon (1977)

Births
1 January – Anna Acton, actress
13 January – Orlando Bloom, actor
10 March – Rita Simons, actress, singer and model
23 April – Babita Sharma, newsreader
4 April – Stephen Mulhern, magician and presenter 
13 May – Samantha Morton, actress
24 May – Jo Joyner, actress
30 May – Rachael Stirling, actress
31 May – Debbie King, presenter
5 June – Emma Crosby, newsreader, presenter and journalist
22 August – Sarah Champion, presenter and disc jockey
1 September – Lucy Pargeter, actress
12 September – James McCartney, singer and songwriter
15 September – Tom Hardy, actor
25 September – Georgie Thompson, sports journalist
3 October – Shazia Mirza, comedian
3 December – Jennifer James, actress
23 December – Matt Baker, presenter
Unknown – Adrian Dickson, presenter

Deaths
25 February – Patricia Haines, 45, actress
29 August – Edward Sinclair, 63, actor (verger Maurice Yeatman in Dad's Army)

See also
 1977 in British music
 1977 in British radio
 1977 in the United Kingdom
 List of British films of 1977

References